The 2nd Colonial Infantry Division was a French Army formation which fought in World War I and World War II.

World War I  

At the start of World War I, the division was commanded by General Paul Leblois and composed of:
4e Brigade d'Infanterie Coloniale, Colonel Boudonnet (Toulon)
4e Régiment d'Infanterie Coloniale
8e Régiment d'Infanterie Coloniale
6e Brigade d'Infanterie Coloniale, Général Caudrelier (Marseille)
22e Régiment d'infanterie Coloniale 
24e Régiment d'infanterie Coloniale

During the entire 1st World War, the Division was part of the French 1st Colonial Corps and fought in many major battles in France.

1927 - 1940  
On 1 November 1927, the 2nd Senegalese Colonial Infantry Division was recreated by transformation of the 30th infantry division. 
It was stationed in Toulon, and later renamed 2nd Colonial Infantry Division.

During the Battle of France in May 1940 the division was made up of the following units:
 Régiment d'Infanterie Coloniale du Maroc (RICM) (from 15 december 1939)
4th Senegalese Tirailleurs Regiment
8th Senegalese Tirailleurs Regiment
72nd Reconnaissance Battalion
2nd Colonial Divisionary Artillery Regiment
202nd Colonial Heavy Artillery Regiment

The Division was first stationed in the Alps, but later moved to the North, where it fought in the Seine and Loire regions.  
The Division was disbanded after the capitulation of the French Army in June 1940.

References

Sources  
 This article is translated from French Wikipedia.

Colonial Infantry Division, 2nd
Infantry divisions of France
French West Africa